Ang Munting Paraiso is a Filipino weekly drama aired on ABS-CBN from March 6, 1999, to June 1, 2002, replacing Coney Reyes on Camera and was replaced by Tanging Yaman: The Series. It stars Coney Reyes in his first series since ...on Camera.

Background
The program, literary translates "Little Paradise", portrays the contemporary Filipino family based on the American television series 7th Heaven. It is about the Dionisio family through which the creators aims to depict a role model for Filipino family.

The program was billed by veteran Filipino television actors Ronaldo Valdez and Coney Reyes, Ann Villegas, C.J. Ramos and Jericho Rosales. It also introduced then new talents Sarah Christophers, Shiela Marie Rodriguez and Camilla Villamil.

Broadcast
Premiered on ABS-CBN from March 6, 1999, to June 1, 2002, replacing Coney Reyes on Camera and was replaced by Tanging Yaman: The Series.

Reruns
Ang Munting Paraiso reruns were previously aired every Sundays at 3:00 PM and Mondays at 8:00 AM on Jeepney TV. Currently, it is being aired every Tuesday to Saturday from 12:00AM to 2:00AM on the YouTube-based channel Kapamilya Online Live Global, replacing Nang Ngumiti ang Langit starting September 24, 2022.

Starting November 5, 2022, the series is also currently streaming online on YouTube.

ABS-CBN Entertainment YouTube channel has uploaded full episodes.

This series was aired on Kapamilya Online Live Global from September 2022 to January 12, 2023.

Cast and characters

Main cast 
 Coney Reyes as Margarita "Margie" Dionisio
 Ronaldo Valdez as Dr. Martin Dionisio

Supporting cast 
 CJ Ramos as Diego "Digoy" Dionisio
 Sarah Christophers as Carolina "Carol" Dionisio
 Jericho Rosales as Alberto "Albert"  Dionisio
 Anne Villegas as Gunding Dionisio
 Camilla Villamil as Erika "Ikay" Dionisio
 Sheila Marie Rodriguez as Beatrice "Bea" Dionisio
 Kristine Hermosa as Rowena, Alberto's love interest 
 Norman Hernandez as Homer
 Nathalie Rheinhardt as Jewel Mendez
 Karlyn Bayot as Jamie

Guest cast 
 Aiza Seguerra
 Luz Fernandez 
 Julia Clarete as Susan
 Lui Manansala
 Errol Dionisio as Kadyo
 Jeff Long
 Aurora Halili as Jenny
 Carmi Martin as Lora
 Toby Alejar as Dante
 Dimples Romana
 Tanya Garcia
 Alessandra De Rossi
 Laura James
 Crystal Gayle Valencia
 Jacqueline Co
 Andrei Felix
 Melissa Avelino
 Rodney Shattara as Boom 
 Leo Gamboa
 Ernie Zarate as Lolo Pilo
 Dominic Ochoa as Jimmy
 Rez Cortez
 Jaime Blanch
 Nino Alejandro
 Jaclyn Jose
 Efren Reyes Jr.
 Kristopher Peralta 
 Princess Ann Schuck
 Lara Fabregas
 Tracy Vergel as Ivy
 Jennifer Illustre
 Sirk Cortez
 Juan Rodrigo
 Chat Silayan
 Joy Viado
 Iwi Nicolas
 Wowie De Guzman as Omar
 Chanda Romero as Rosing
 Ruel Vernal as Ernie
 John Regala
 Cogie Domingo
 Carlo Muñoz
 Minnie Aguilar as Bless 
 Cris Pineda
 Connie Chua
 Rosalinda Cheng
 John Lapus
 Richard Quan
 Steven Alonzo as Billy 
 Michael Verrano as Mike Paragas
 Orestes Ojeda as Mulong
 Hazel Ann Mendoza as Lally
 Patricia Ann Roque as Ning
 Bernard Cardona as Jonathan
 J.R. Herrera
 Vanessa De Blanco as Michelle
 Smokey Manaloto
 LJ Moreno-Alapag as Teresa
 Angelo Caangay
 Sunshine Cruz as Charlie 
 Alwyn Uytingco
 Joseph Reyes
 Matthew Mendoza
 Alma Lerma
 Michael Roy Jornales as Luigi
 Monsour del Rosario
 Celine Lirio
 Benjie Valdez
 Alfred Manal
 Aljon Tolipas
 Marga Madrilejos
 Anna Larrucea as Clarissa
 Eva Darren
 Ray Ventura
 Ronnie Lazaro as Mang Rene 
 Nova Villa
 Spanky Manikan
 Idda Yaneza
 Carla Guevarra as Honey 
 Whitney Tyson as Yaya Bebang
 Niña de Sagun as Chinie
 Moreen Guese as Denise
 Vhong Navarro as Joseph
 Aljon Valdenebro
 Gabby Eigenmann as Raffy San Gabriel
 Boy 2 Quizon as Alvin
 Gloria Diaz
 Nicole Anderson as Cherish Mendez
 Nida Blanca as Mamu
 Kooch Mapua
 Chinggoy Alonzo as George
 Gandong Cervantes as Mang Antonio
 Justeen Niebres
 Keempee de Leon as Martin "Jun" Dionisio, Jr.
 Eddie Gutierrez as Tony
 Norman Hernandez
 Nathalie Rheinhardt as Jewel
 Timmy Cruz
 Rex Agoncillo
 John Blair Sacce
 Angelo Muñoz
 Missy King
 Aurelio Esmino
 Glydel Mercado as Doris
 Nicole Allison Mendiola
 CJ Jaravata
 Aiko Morales
 Maritoni Fernandez
 Ricardo Cepeda
 Bernardo Bernardo
 John Lloyd Cruz as Boyet
 Irma Adlawan
 Dennis Marasigan
 Ced Torrecarion
 Girlie Alcantara
 Alma Concepcion as Leila
 Malou de Guzman
 Troy Montero as Darwin
 Nikki Valdez
 Lei Atienza
 Aiza Marquez
 Encar Benedicto
 Sylvia Sanchez
 Pen Medina as Mang Natoy
 Ces Quesada
 Ana Capri
 Eula Valdez
 Peter Serrano as Ling
 Agot Isidro as Jackie
 Dennis Roldan as Doc Mendez 
 Eric Quizon
 Diether Ocampo
 Baron Geisler
 Angelika Dela Cruz
 Marvin Agustin
 Jolina Magdangal
 Carmina Villaroel
 Zoren Legaspi as Vince 
 Kier Legaspi
 Brando Legaspi
 Joel Torre
 Emman Abeleda
 Patrick Garcia
 Carlo Aquino
 John Prats
 Stefano Mori
 Candy Pangilinan
 Bella Flores as Liway 
 John Arcilla
 Nanette Inventor
 Bembol Roco
 Lito Legaspi
 Tirso Cruz III
 Janice de Belen
 John Estrada
 Jaime Fabregas
 Issa Fabregas as Yumi Ocampo 
 Mark Gil
 Cherie Gil
 Michael de Mesa 
 Timmy Cruz
 Mely Tagasa
 Susan Africa
 Gina Alajar
 Mark Vernal
 Kevin Vernal
 Isko Moreno 
 Gloria Sevilla
 Jon Achaval
 Ama Quiambao
 Amy Perez 
 Dennis Padilla as Dr. Danny 
 Cherry Pie Picache
 Ricky Rivero 
 Dante Rivero
 Lovely Rivero
 Gio Alvarez 
 Jestoni Alarcon 
 Rita Avila 
 Suzette Ranillo
 Liza Ranillo as Lolita
 Mat Ranillo III
 Angelica Panganiban 
 Tonton Gutierrez 
 Eddie Garcia
 Edu Manzano 
 Camille Prats
 Shaina Magdayao
 Serena Dalrymple
 Agatha Tapan
 Robert Arevalo
 Gloria Romero
 Gina Pareño
 Augusto Victa 
 Richard Merck
 Manny Castañeda
 Mark Anthony Fernandez 
 Jennifer Sevilla
 Nonie Buencamino
 Odette Khan 
 Subas Herrero as Lolo Gario
 Noel Trinidad
 Anita Linda as Eva 
 Marita Zobel
 Rosa Rosal
 Jeffrey Hidalgo
 Ryan Eigenmann
 Geoff Eigenmann
 Andrea Del Rosario
 Dick Israel
 Archie Adamos
 Danny Labra
 Anna Marin
 Vangie Labalan
 Beverly Salviejo
 Marissa Delgado
 Mon Confiado
 Lou Veloso
 Jean Garcia
 Rosemarie Gil
 Robert Ortega 
 Jojo Alejar
 Amy Austria 
 Johnny Delgado
 Bernard Palanca
 Lui Villaruz
 Tommy Abuel as Dr. Silva
 Mymy Davao
 Bing Davao
 Ricky Davao
 Charlie Davao
 Fanny Serrano
 Jackie Lou Blanco
 Nante Montreal
 Lucita Soriano
 Ramon Christopher
 Lotlot De Leon
 Manilyn Reynes 
 Aljon Jimenez
 Pewee O' Hara
 Carlos Agassi
 Jiro Manio
 Nonong de Andres
 Kuhol
 Tess Dumpit
 Pocholo Montes 
 Perla Bautista
 Gardo Versoza
 Ogie Diaz
 Nanding Josef
 Luis Gonzales
 Al Tantay
 Rio Locsin
 Lito Pimentel 
 Empress Schuck
 Cris Villanueva
 Jennifer Mendoza
 Carol Banawa
 Lorena Garcia
 Monina Bagatsing
 Diana Enriquez
 Rachelle Garrucho as Josephine (A.K.A. Jo)
 Via Veloso
 Cheska Garcia
 Eric Fructuoso
 Spencer Reyes
 Elizabeth Oropesa
 Gladys Reyes
 Christopher Roxas
 Flora Gasser
 Allan Paule
 Melissa Mendez
 Corrine Mendez
 Marianne dela Riva
 Emilio Garcia
 Romnick Sarmenta
 Caridad Sanchez
 Ester Chavez
 Soliman Cruz
 Mandy Ochoa
 Mylene Dizon
 Allen Dizon
 Victor Neri
 Ian Veneracion as Siegfried "Tres"
 Jeffrey Santos
 Rustom Padilla
 Angel Aquino
 Albert Martinez
 Ramil Rodriguez
 Celia Rodriguez
 Maricel Laxa
 William Martinez
 Yayo Aguila
 Tiya Pusit
 Harlene Bautista
 Hero Bautista
 Eugene Domingo
 Rosanna Roces
 Sharmaine Suarez
 Mel Kimura
 Beth Tamayo
 Raffy Bonanza
 Jodi Sta. Maria
 Roldan Aquino
 Peque Gallaga
 Glenda Garcia
 Kathleen Hermosa
 Sherilyn Reyes
 Sharmaine Arnaiz 
 Maricel Morales
 Gelli de Belen
 Ariel Rivera
 Paolo Contis
 Giselle Sanchez
 Dexter Doria
 Raymond Bagatsing
 Richard Arellano
 Gilleth Sandico
 Carlos Morales
 Ricky Rivero
 Kris Aquino
 Isabel Rivas
 Leo Martinez
 Bojo Molina
 Leandro Muñoz
 Bobby Andrews
 Berting Labra
 Paquito Diaz
 Romy Diaz
 Vandolph
 Manjo Del Mundo
 Sammy Lagmay
 Rica Peralejo
 Paula Peralejo
 Bernadette Allyson
 Onemig Bondoc
 Bentong
 Princess Schuck
 Patrick Dela Rosa
 Marissa Sanchez
 Chin Chin Gutierrez
 Boots Anson-Roa
 Menggie Cobarrubias as Julio (Father's Daughter Jamie) 
 Isabel Granada
 Bearwin Meily
 Evangeline Pascual
 Jay Manalo
 Niño Muhlach
 Guila Alvarez
 Mel Martinez
 Cita Astals
 Carding Castro
 Ronalisa Cheng
 Pinky Amador
 Lorli Villanueva 
 Marc Solis
 Jan Marini Alano
 Bonel Balingit
 Gerald Pizzaras
 Roy Alvarez
 Melanie Marquez
 Maila Gumila
 Kristine Bondoc
 Ian De Leon
 Mia Gutierrez
 Hilda Koronel
 Shamaine Centenera
 Miguel dela Rosa
 Tom Olivar
 Gammy Viray
 Jean Saburit
 Mike Gayoso
 Rosanna Jover
 Robin da Roza
 Snooky Serna
 William Lorenzo
 Bong Regala
 Alvin Anson
 Alicia Alonzo
 Miguel Vera
 Desiree del Valle
 Nelson Evangelista
 Heart Evangelista as Missy (G-MIK Guest Encounter of Carol On Ang Munting Paraiso)
 Pops Fernandez
 Jeffrey Quizon
 Teresa Loyzaga
 Lester Llansang
 Alma Moreno
 April Boy Regino
 Joseph Roble
 Doreen Bernal
 Ronnie Quizon
 Princess Punzalan
 Vic Vargas
 Daniel Fernando
 Stella Ruiz
 Liza Lorena as Mameng
 Boboy Garrovillo as Oka
 Tuesday Vargas
 Vernie Varga as Lolita
 Cholo Escano as Gab
 Mark Bryan Homecillo as Tom "Tomas" (Ikay's Boyfriend)
 Pinky de Leon
 Philip Lazaro
 Ace Espinosa
 Jess Lapid
 Pilita Corrales
 Christopher de Leon
 Aya Medel
 Wilma Doesnt
 Tetchie Agbayani
 Maria Isabel Lopez
 Jun Urbano
 Tin Arnaldo
 Khalil Kaimo as Eric
 Janus del Prado
 Vivian Foz as Celia
 Janna Victoria as Gemma
 Lloyd Zaragoza as Barry 
 John Apacible as Leon
 Migui Moreno
 Mario Magallona
 Chris Manjares
 Winnie Cordero as Bebeng 
 Neil Ryan Sese as Ador (Father's Ria)
 Hannah Bustillos as Ria
 Marianne Savanno as Kelly
 Lance Castillo as Nathan
 Christian Alvear

References

See also
List of programs aired by ABS-CBN
List of ABS-CBN original drama series

ABS-CBN drama series
Philippine drama television series
1999 Philippine television series debuts
2002 Philippine television series endings
Filipino-language television shows
Television shows set in the Philippines